Mostafa Mahmoud Kahraba (Arabic: مصطفى كهربا; born 10 November 1987) is an Egyptian footballer who plays as an attacking midfielder for Bangladesh Premier League club Chittagong Abahani.

Career

Before the 2019 season, Kahraba signed for Maldivian side TC Sports Club.

Ahead the 2020-21 season, he signed for Bangladesh Premier League side Arambagh KS in Bangladesh.

In December 2020, he joined Uttar Baridhara Club of same top flight. He scored six goals and assisted 11 times in 42 league appearances for Baridhara. However, his team suffered relegation in 2021-22 Premier League season.

In October 2022, Mostafa joined Indian club Agiye Chalo Sangha. The club plays in Chandra Memorial A Division League, the top tier league of Tripura region and overall fourth tier of Indian football league system.

On 14 March 2023, he came back to top level football as he joined Bangladesh Premier League club Chittagong Abahani.

References

External links
 

Egyptian footballers
Living people
Expatriate footballers in Bangladesh
Egyptian expatriate footballers
1987 births
Association football midfielders
Arambagh KS players
Bangladesh Football Premier League players
Egyptian Premier League players
Wadi Degla SC players
Ittihad El Shorta SC players
Al-Hejaz Club players
Saudi Second Division players
Expatriate footballers in the Maldives
Expatriate footballers in Saudi Arabia
Egyptian expatriate sportspeople in Saudi Arabia
T.C. Sports Club players
Uttar Baridhara SC players